Melissa C. Navia (born August 24, 1984) is an American actress known for playing Erica Ortegas in Star Trek: Strange New Worlds (2022).

In 2013, Navia won the award for best actress at the Wild Rose Independent Film Festival for her role as Dawn in the sci-fi movie The Paragon Cortex. In 2015, she had a recurring role in the TV series Common Charges. In 2017, she had a guest role as Elena Gabriel, an astronaut bound for a life on Mars, in Showtime's series Billions. In 2018, she had a recurring role as Moana in AMC's series Dietland.

Personal life
Her partner, Brian Bannon, died in 2021, three days after being diagnosed with leukemia.

Awards and nominations

Filmography

Film

Television

References

External links

 

1984 births
Living people
American actresses
Colombian actresses